Xiacun Township is a rural township in Yanling County, Hunan Province, People's Republic of China.

Cityscape
The township is divided into 14 villages, the following areas: Tongle Village, Nihu Village, Changyuan Village, Tianxin Village, Aotou Village, Dongkeng Village, Xiyuan Village, Yunli Village, Jiufeng Village, Pingkeng Village, Changxi Village, Dahengxi Village, Henggang Village, and Qingsong Village.

References

External links

Divisions of Yanling County